Baqerabad-e Sofla (also Romanized as Bāqerābād-e Soflá) is a village in Hasanabad Rural District, in the Central District of Eslamabad-e Gharb County, Kermanshah Province, Iran. At the 2006 census, its population was 668, in 139 families.

References 

Populated places in Eslamabad-e Gharb County